Indrek Kajupank (born 15 May 1988) is an Estonian professional basketball player for BC Tallinna Kalev of the Latvian-Estonian Basketball League. He is a 2.00 m (6 ft 7 in) tall small forward and power forward. He also represents the Estonian national basketball team internationally.

Awards and accomplishments

Professional career
Kalev
 3× Estonian League champion:2009, 2013, 2014

Individual
 2xAll-KML Team: 2016–2017

References

External links
 Indrek Kajupank at basket.ee 
 Indrek Kajupank at fiba.com

1988 births
Living people
Estonian men's basketball players
Power forwards (basketball)
Small forwards
Korvpalli Meistriliiga players
BC Kalev/Cramo players
Rapla KK players
People from Saaremaa Parish